Attilio Calatroni (born 18 July 1950) is an Italian fencer. He won a silver medal in the team foil event at the 1976 Summer Olympics.

References

External links
 
 
 

1950 births
Living people
Italian male fencers
Olympic fencers of Italy
Olympic silver medalists for Italy
Olympic medalists in fencing
Fencers at the 1976 Summer Olympics
Medalists at the 1976 Summer Olympics
Sportspeople from Brescia